Edgar John Swann (born 1942) was an Irish Anglican priest during  the second half of the 20th century.

Swann was educated at Trinity College, Oxford. He was ordained deacon in 1968 and priest in 1969. After curacies in Crumlin and Howth he became Rector at Greystones. He was Archdeacon of Glendalough from 1994 to 2008.

Notes

20th-century Irish Anglican priests
21st-century Irish Anglican priests
Archdeacons of Glendalough
Alumni of Trinity College Dublin
Living people
1942 births